The 2018 WWE Superstar Shake-up was the twelfth WWE draft, produced by the American professional wrestling promotion WWE between the Raw and SmackDown brands. Instead of a traditional draft, changes between the brands were made behind the scenes, with moving wrestlers simply appearing on a brand's show or announced via WWE's website or social medias. The two-day event took place on the April 16 and April 17 episodes of Monday Night Raw and SmackDown Live, respectively, on the USA Network in the United States. Raw was broadcast from Hartford, Connecticut at the XL Center, and SmackDown was broadcast from the Dunkin' Donuts Center in Providence, Rhode Island.

Background 
The WWE Draft is an annual process used by the American professional wrestling promotion WWE while a brand extension, or brand split, is in effect. The original brand extension occurred from 2002 to 2011, while the second and current brand split began in 2016. During a brand extension, the company divides its roster into brands where the wrestlers exclusively perform for each brand's respective television show, and the draft is used to refresh the rosters of the brand divisions, typically between the Raw and SmackDown brands.

In 2017, WWE rebranded the draft as the Superstar Shake-up to replace the traditional draft the company had done in 2016. On the April 9, 2018 episode of Monday Night Raw, WWE announced another Superstar Shake-up for the April 16 and 17 episodes of Raw and SmackDown, respectively. Instead of a traditional draft, the commissioners and general managers of Raw and SmackDown made trades and other deals behind the scenes between their respective talent, which also included the promotion and drafting of wrestlers from the NXT brand. On April 10, Paige, who had retired from in-ring competition the previous night, was introduced as SmackDown's new general manager. She replaced Daniel Bryan, who returned to being a full-time wrestler.

Selection

Raw 
The following wrestlers and other personnel changed brands on the April 16 episode of Raw.

SmackDown 
The following wrestlers and other personnel changed brands on the April 17 episode of SmackDown.

Notes
 Two tag teams were split up as a result of the Superstar Shake-up. In September 2017, Jeff Hardy took time off due to an injury. He returned the week prior to the Superstar Shake-up, but was then moved to SmackDown while Matt Hardy remained on Raw, splitting up The Hardy Boyz. The team of Chad Gable and Shelton Benjamin was split as Gable moved to Raw while Benjamin remained on SmackDown.
 The United States Championship moved from SmackDown to Raw and then back to SmackDown. Reigning champion Jinder Mahal moved to Raw on the April 16 episode of Raw and lost the title to Jeff Hardy who moved to SmackDown the following night on SmackDown.

Aftermath

On Raw, after being drafted with the United States Championship, Jinder Mahal immediately lost the title to Jeff Hardy and failed to win it back at the Greatest Royal Rumble. He then had a short feud with Roman Reigns as well as a storyline with Kevin Owens and Braun Strowman. The Riott Squad (Ruby Riott, Liv Morgan, and Sarah Logan) made their debut by attacking Bayley and Sasha Banks. Over the following year, they feuded with the likes of The Bella Twins (Brie Bella and Nikki Bella) and Ronda Rousey, with each member unsuccessfully facing Rousey for the Raw Women's Championship, and Morgan and Logan also challenged for the inaugural WWE Women's Tag Team Championship. Kevin Owens and Sami Zayn lost their initial match on Raw and had a short feud with Braun Strowman and the returning Bobby Lashley. Later in the year, both suffered injuries, requiring them to take time off, subsequently disbanding their team. Both returned in early 2019, but with Owens on SmackDown while Zayn remained on Raw. Shortly after the Superstar Shake-up, Zack Ryder injured his knee, taking him out of action for several weeks. After his return, he reignited his feud with Mojo Rawley. After moving to Raw, Natalya became a fan favorite and had a storyline with Ronda Rousey and a short feud with Ruby Riott. Dolph Ziggler and Drew McIntyre formed a tag team and feuded with Seth Rollins. Ziggler went on to win the Intercontinental Championship, and the two also won the Raw Tag Team Championship before McIntyre turned on Ziggler. In mid-2018, Baron Corbin was made the Constable of Raw by the brand's commissioner Stephanie McMahon and eventually became the Acting Raw General Manager after Kurt Angle was forced to go on vacation by Stephanie. He also feuded with Braun Strowman in the later half of the year. Although he was moved to Raw, Mike Kanellis primarily appeared on Main Event and was eventually moved to the 205 Live brand along with his wife Maria Kanellis. Bobby Roode and Chad Gable eventually formed a tag team and later won the Raw Tag Team Championship.

After moving to SmackDown, bringing the United States Championship back to the brand, Jeff Hardy feuded with Randy Orton and Shinsuke Nakamura, dropping the title to the latter. Before moving to SmackDown, The Miz lost the Intercontinental Championship to Seth Rollins at WrestleMania 34. He had two rematches to regain the title, at Greatest Royal Rumble and Backlash, but failed in both attempts, and later in the year, reignited his feud with Daniel Bryan. After former Absolution leader and new SmackDown General Manager Paige made it clear that she would not show them special treatment, Mandy Rose and Sonya Deville dropped the name Absolution but remained a tag team. Although tensions rose between the two, they challenged for the inaugural WWE Women's Tag Team Championship. Despite moving to SmackDown, Samoa Joe had an opportunity at the Intercontinental Championship at the Greatest Royal Rumble, but lost. He also faced Raw's Roman Reigns at Backlash, but also lost that match. He then entered into a feud with AJ Styles over the WWE Championship, and although unsuccessful at gaining that title, he won the United States Championship before the year's end. Big Cass immediately began a feud with Daniel Bryan that he ultimately lost before being released from his WWE contract in June. Asuka began a feud with Carmella over the SmackDown Women's Championship that she ultimately lost, however, she eventually won the title before the year's end. Luke Gallows and Karl Anderson earned an opportunity for the SmackDown Tag Team Championship at Money in the Bank, but failed. Before moving to SmackDown, Cesaro and Sheamus were granted an opportunity at the Raw Tag Team Championship at the Greatest Royal Rumble, but failed to win the titles. They then officially changed their team name to The Bar, previously a nickname, and began a pursuit for the SmackDown Tag Team Championship, which they eventually won. R-Truth eventually formed a partnership with Carmella and the two would go on to win Mixed Match Challenge Season 2. After moving to SmackDown, Andrade began a feud with Sin Cara. The Hardy Boyz eventually reunited; in mid-2018, Matt Hardy went on hiatus, but when he returned in February 2019, he returned on the SmackDown brand and reunited with Jeff. Nikki Cross was eventually called up in December 2018, but did not rejoin Sanity and appeared on both Raw and SmackDown.

References

WWE Draft
WWE draft
Professional wrestling in Hartford, Connecticut
Professional wrestling in Providence, Rhode Island
April 2018 events in the United States
Events in Hartford, Connecticut
Events in Providence, Rhode Island
2018 in Connecticut
2018 in Rhode Island